Olenyoksky District (Ölöön uluuha), or Olenyoksky-Evenki National District, is an administrative and municipal district (raion, or ulus), one of the thirty-four in the Sakha Republic, Russia. It is located in the west of the republic and borders with Anabarsky District in the north, Bulunsky and Zhigansky Districts in the east, Vilyuysky, Verkhnevilyuysky, and Nyurbinsky Districts in the southeast, Mirninsky District in the south and southwest, and with Evenkiysky District Krasnoyarsk Krai in the west and northwest. Its administrative center is the rural locality (a selo) of Olenyok. Population:  4,091 (2002 Census);  The population of Olenyok accounts for 55.1% of the district's total population.

Geography 
The main rivers in the district are the Olenyok, with its tributaries Arga-Sala (with its tributaries Kengeede, Kukusunda. Kyuyonelikeen and Kyuyonelekeen), Alakit, Siligir, Merchimden, Ukukit, Birekte, Kuoyka and Beyenchime, as well as the Anabar. The largest lake is Lake Eyik, located at the southern end of the district.

History
The district was established on October 1, 1935.

Demographics
As of the 1989 Census, the ethnic composition was as follows:
Evenks: 54.3%
Yakuts: 32.2%
Russians: 9.1%
Evens: 0.7%
other ethnicities: 3.7%

Economy 
The economy of the district is mostly based on agriculture. There are deposits of diamonds, natural gas, and construction materials.

Inhabited localities

Divisional source:

*Administrative centers are shown in bold

References

Notes

Sources

Districts of the Sakha Republic
States and territories established in 1935